Mathis Künzler (born 13 June 1978 in Basel) is a Swiss film, television and stage actor. He grew up in suburban Münchenstein, close to the borders of France and Germany.

Filmography

Films 
 2005: Snow White
 2009: Räuberinnen

TV 
 2004–2006: Verliebt in Berlin in English: Love in Berlin.
 2007–2008: R. I. S. – Die Sprache der Toten

External links

1978 births
Living people
Swiss male stage actors
Swiss male film actors
Swiss male television actors
People from Basel-Landschaft
Zurich University of the Arts alumni